Hamad Al-Obeidi (born 21 April 1991 in Doha) is a Qatari  footballer who currently plays for Qatar Stars League side Al Sailiya. He is a graduate of Qatar's Aspire Academy.

International career
Hamad Al Abedy has played for the Qatar Olympic football team in the GGC U23 tournament in August 2011.

Honours
Emir of Qatar Cup
Winner (1): 2011 with Al Rayyan SC.

Notes

1991 births
Living people
Al-Rayyan SC players
Al Kharaitiyat SC players
Al-Sailiya SC players
Al-Duhail SC players
Qatar Stars League players
Footballers at the 2010 Asian Games
Qatari footballers
Aspire Academy (Qatar) players
Association football defenders
Association football midfielders
Asian Games competitors for Qatar